Baugh Creek is a tributary of the Little Wood River. The creek is located in Sawtooth National Forest right next to Buck Creek.

Birds 
There have been 3 different specie sightings of birds near the creek:
Lazuli Bunting
Spotted Towhee
Song Sparrow

References 

Rivers of Idaho
Tributaries of the Snake River
Rivers of Blaine County, Idaho